Colour Moving and Still is the second studio album by Canadian singer and songwriter Chantal Kreviazuk. It was released on October 5, 1999, by Columbia Records. A special edition of the album is also available with a bonus disc. An edition of the album released in Taiwan includes all of the tracks of the album, as well as all of the tracks on the bonus disc released on one disc.

Track listing
All songs written by Chantal Kreviazuk, with co-writers as shown.

"Blue" – 4:58
"Dear Life" (Kreviazuk, Raine Maida) – 3:29
"Until We Die" – 3:55
"Souls" – 5:09
"Before You" (Kreviazuk, Jay Joyce) – 3:53
"M" – 4:00
"Soul Searching" – 3:26
"Far Away" (Kreviazuk, Chris Burke-Gaffney) – 3:49
"Eve" – 3:46
"Little Things" (Kreviazuk, Maida) – 4:35

Bonus disc
"Leaving on a Jet Plane" (John Denver) – 4:40
featured on the soundtrack for the movie Armageddon
"Feels Like Home" (Randy Newman) – 4:40
featured on the soundtrack for the television show Dawson's Creek
"In My Life" (John Lennon, Paul McCartney) – 2:33
theme song for the NBC television show Providence

Singles
"Leaving on a Jet Plane" (bonus track)
"Feels Like Home" (bonus track)
"Before You"
"Dear Life"
"Souls"
"Far Away"

Personnel
Chantal Kreviazuk – piano, vocals, Wurlitzer
Matt Chamberlain – drums
Luke Doucet – acoustic guitar
Chris Feinstein – bass guitar
Jay Joyce – bass, guitar, electric guitar, keyboards, baritone guitar
Giles Reaves – organ, keyboards, tambourine, snare drums
Jeremy Taggart – drums

Production
Producer: Jay Joyce
Engineers: Everett Ravestein, Giles Reaves, Blair Robb Assistant, Rick "Soldier" Will
Digital engineer: Giles Reaves
Assistant engineer: Everett Ravestein
Mixing: Kevin Killen, Giles Reaves
Mastering: Bob Ludwig
Programming: Jay Joyce
Loop programming: Giles Reaves
A&R Direction: Mike Roth
Production coordination: Tanya Nagowski
Art direction: Gail Marowitz
Design: Alice Butts

Charts

Year-end charts

References

1999 albums
Albums produced by Jay Joyce
Chantal Kreviazuk albums
Columbia Records albums
Juno Award for Pop Album of the Year albums